The 2014 All-SEC football team consists of American football players selected to the All-Southeastern Conference (SEC) chosen by the Associated Press (AP) and the conference coaches for the 2014 Southeastern Conference football season.

The Alabama Crimson Tide won the conference, beating the Missouri Tigers 42 to 13 in the SEC Championship. The Crimson Tide then lost in the College Football Playoff Semifinal to the eventual national champion, the Ohio State Buckeyes 42 to 35.

Alabama wide receiver Amari Cooper, a unanimous AP selection, was voted the AP SEC Offensive Player of the Year. Missouri defensive end Shane Ray was voted the AP SEC Defensive Player of the Year.

Offensive selections

Quarterbacks
 Dak Prescott, Miss. St. (AP-1, Coaches-1)
 Blake Sims, Alabama (AP-2, Coaches-2)

Running backs
 Cameron Artis-Payne, Auburn (AP-1, Coaches-1)
 Nick Chubb, Georgia (AP-1, Coaches-1)
 Josh Robinson, Miss. St. (AP-2, Coaches-2)
 Jonathan Williams, Arkansas (AP-2)
 T. J. Yeldon, Alabama (Coaches-2)

Wide receivers
 Amari Cooper*, Alabama (AP-1, Coaches-1)
 Pharoh Cooper, South Carolina (AP-1, Coaches-1)
 Bud Sasser, Missouri (AP-1, Coaches-2)
 Josh Reynolds, Texas A&M (AP-2)
 Sammie Coates, Auburn (AP-2, Coaches-2)

Centers
 Reese Dismukes, Auburn (AP-1, Coaches-1)
 David Andrews, Georgia (AP-2)
 Max Garcia, Florida (Coaches-2)

Guards
 Arie Kouandjio, Alabama (AP-1, Coaches-1)
 Ben Beckwith, Miss. St. (AP-1, Coaches-2)
 A. J. Cann, South Carolina (AP-2, Coaches-1)
 Greg Pyke, Georgia (AP-2)
Vadal Alexander, LSU (Coaches-2)

Tackles
 Lael Collins, LSU (AP-1, Coaches-1)
 Laremy Tunsil, Ole Miss (AP-1, Coaches-2)
 Cedric Ogbuehi, Texas A&M (AP-2, Coaches-1)
 Austin Shepherd, Alabama (AP-2)
 Mitch Morse, Missouri (Coaches-2)

Tight ends
 Evan Engram, Ole Miss (AP-1, Coaches-1)
 Steven Scheu, Vanderbilt (AP-2)
Hunter Henry, Arkansas (Coaches-2)

Defensive selections

Defensive ends
 Shane Ray, Missouri (AP-1, Coaches-1) 
 Bud Dupree, Kentucky (AP-1, Coaches-1) 
 Preston Smith, Miss. St. (AP-2, Coaches-1) 
 Dante Fowler, Florida (Coaches-1)
 Derek Barnett, Tennessee (AP-2, Coaches-2)
 Myles Garrett, Texas A&M (AP-2, Coaches-2)
 Trey Flowers, Arkansas (Coaches-2)
Markus Golden, Missouri (Coaches-2)
Jonathan Allen, Alabama (AP-1)

Defensive tackles 
 Robert Nkemdiche, Ole Miss (AP-1) 
 Darius Philon, Arkansas (AP-2)

Linebackers
 Martrell Spaight, Arkansas (AP-1, Coaches-1)
 Amarlo Herrera, Georgia (AP-1, Coaches-2)
 Benardrick McKinney, Miss. St. (AP-2, Coaches-1)
 Reggie Ragland, Alabama (AP-1)
Trey DePriest, Alabama (Coaches-1)
 Antonio Morrison, Florida (AP-2, Coaches-2)
 Ramik Wilson, Georgia (AP-2, Coaches-2)
 Kwon Alexander, LSU (AP-2)
 Kentrell Brothers, Missouri (AP-2)
 Curt Maggitt, Tennessee (AP-2)

Cornerbacks
 Senquez Golson*, Ole Miss (AP-1, Coaches-1) 
 Vernon Hargreaves III, Florida (AP-1, Coaches-1)
 Damian Swann, Georgia (AP-2, Coaches-2)
 Jonathan Jones, Auburn (AP-2, Coaches-2)
 Cyrus Jones, Alabama (AP-2)

Safeties 
 Landon Collins*, Alabama (AP-1, Coaches-1)
 Cody Prewitt, Ole Miss  (AP-1, Coaches-1)
 Braylon Webb, Missouri (AP-2, Coaches-2)
 Ronald Martin, LSU (AP-2)
 Tony Conner, Ole Miss (AP-2)
Jonathon Mincy, Auburn (Coaches-2)

Special teams

Kickers
 Austin MacGinnis, Kentucky (AP-1, Coaches-1)
 Josh Lambo, Texas A&M (AP-2)
Elliott Fry, South Carolina (Coaches-2)

Punters
 J. K. Scott, Alabama (AP-1, Coaches-1)
 Kyle Christy, Florida (AP-2)
Jamie Keehn, LSU (Coaches-2)

All purpose/return specialist
Marcus Murphy, Missouri (AP-1, Coaches-1)
Pharoh Cooper, South Carolina (AP-2)
Quan Bray, Auburn (Coaches-2)

Key
Bold = Consensus first-team selection by both the coaches and AP

AP = Associated Press

Coaches = Selected by the SEC coaches

* = Unanimous selection of AP

See also
2014 Southeastern Conference football season
2014 College Football All-America Team

References

All-Southeastern Conference
All-SEC football teams